Andrónico Luksic may refer to:
 Andrónico Luksic Abaroa (1926–2005), founder of the Luksic Group
 Andrónico Luksic Craig (born 1954), son of Andrónico Luksic Abaroa and chairman of Quiñenco